Country Club Historic District may refer to:
 Country Club Historic District (Birmingham, Alabama), listed on the NRHP in Alabama
 Country Club Historic District (Denver, Colorado), listed on the NRHP in Colorado
 Country Club Historic District (Edina, Minnesota), List of RHPs in MN|listed on the NRHP in Minnesota
 Country Club Historic District (Omaha, Nebraska), listed on the NRHP in Nebraska